Thomas Brice may refer to:

 Tom Brice (born 1981), Australian baseball player
 Thomas Brice (martyrologist) (1536–1571), Church of England clergyman, martyrologist and poet
Tom Brice, character in Across the Continent
 Thomas Hastie Bryce (1862–1946), Scottish anatomist, medical author and archaeologist